The Definition of Free Cultural Works is a definition of free content from 2006. The project evaluates and recommends compatible free content licenses.

History
The Open Content Project by David A. Wiley in 1998 was a predecessor project which defined open content. In 2003, Wiley joined the Creative Commons as "Director of Educational Licenses" and announced the Creative Commons and their licenses as successors to his Open Content Project.

Therefore, Creative Commons' Erik Möller in collaboration with Richard Stallman, Lawrence Lessig, Benjamin Mako Hill, Angela Beesley, and others started in 2006 the Free Cultural Works project for defining free content. The first draft of the Definition of Free Cultural Works was published 2 April 2006. The 1.0 and 1.1 versions were published in English and translated into several languages.

The Definition of Free Cultural Works is used by the Wikimedia Foundation. In 2008, the Attribution and Attribution-ShareAlike Creative Commons licenses were marked as "Approved for Free Cultural Works".

Following in June 2009, Wikipedia migrated to use two licenses: the Creative Commons Attribution-ShareAlike as main license, additionally to the previously used GNU Free Documentation License (which was made compatible). An improved license compatibility with the greater free content ecosystem was given as reason for the license change.

In October 2014, the Open Knowledge Foundation's Open Definition 2.0 for Open Works and Open Licenses described "open" as synonymous to the definition of free in the "Definition of Free Cultural Works" (and also the Open Source Definition and Free Software Definition). A distinct difference is the focus given to the public domain and that it focuses also on the accessibility ("open access") and the readability ("open formats"). The same three creative commons licenses are recommended for open content (CC BY, CC BY-SA, and CC0) as additionally three for open data intended own licenses, the Open Data Commons Public Domain Dedication and Licence (PDDL), the Open Data Commons Attribution License (ODC-BY) and the Open Data Commons Open Database License (ODbL).

"Free cultural works" approved licenses
 Against DRM
 BSD-like non-copyleft licenses
 CERN Open Hardware License
 CC0
 Creative Commons Attribution (CC BY)
 Creative Commons Attribution ShareAlike (CC BY-SA)
 Design Science License
 Free Art License
 FreeBSD Documentation License
 GNU Free Documentation License (without invariant sections)
 GNU General Public License
 MirOS Licence
 MIT License
 Open Publication License

References

External links
 Definition of Free Cultural Works on freedomdefined.org
 2006 Announcement on freedomdefined.org
 Understanding Free Cultural Works on creativecommons.org
 Free content defined on WikiEducator
 FreeCulturalWorks on DeviantArt

 
Computer-related introductions in 2006